John C. Harris (born July 14, 1943, in Fresno, California) is the owner of Harris Farms and is a past president and current member of the executive committee of the California Thoroughbred Breeders Association. A current member of the California Horse Racing Board (CHRB), he served as chairman of the CHRB for the years 2004, 2005 and 2009, and is a former director of the Thoroughbred Owners of California. Harris has been a member of The Jockey Club since 1988.

Harris Farms, founded in 1937, is one of the United States’ leading producers of agricultural products. Harris Ranch Beef Company produces nearly 200 million pounds of beef and is California's largest fed cattle processor. California's leading breeder of thoroughbreds, Harris Farms will stand ten stallions in 2010, including Cee's Tizzy, sire of two-time Breeders' Cup Classic winner Tiznow; Redattore; and Swiss Yodeler.

References 

1943 births
Living people
Businesspeople from California
Farmers from California
Ranchers from California
Sportspeople from Fresno, California
American horse racing industry executives
University of California, Davis alumni